Gastromyzon spectabilis is a species of ray-finned fish in the genus Gastromyzon.

Footnotes

References

Gastromyzon
Fish described in 2006